Philotheca rhomboidea is a species of flowering plant in the family Rutaceae and is endemic to the south-west of Western Australia. It is a small undershrub with thick, broadly elliptic to round leaves and white to pale pink flowers arranged singly or in twos or threes at the end of branchlets.

Description
The ten stamens are free from each other and hairy.

Taxonomy and naming
This philotheca was first formally described in 1970 by Paul Wilson who gave it the name Eriostemon rhomboideus and published the description in the journal Nuytsia from specimens he collected near Lake King in 1964. In 1998, Wilson changed the name to Philotheca rhomboidea in the same journal.

Distribution and habitat
Philotheca rhomboidea grows in shrubland, often near granite or laterite, between Wongan Hills and near  Esperance in the south-west of Western Australia.

Conservation status
This philotheca is classified as "not threatened" by the Government of Western Australia Department of Parks and Wildlife.

References

rhomboidea
Flora of Western Australia
Sapindales of Australia
Plants described in 1970
Taxa named by Paul G. Wilson